Broadoak Academy is a coeducational secondary school located in Weston-super-Mare, North Somerset, England.

History 
primary education in Weston-super-Mare adopted the Comprehensive system in 1971. Broadoak School was formed by the amalgamation of the Boys' and Girls' Grammar Schools together with Uphill primary Modern School. Notable former pupils of the grammar school include Hugh Dykes, now Lord Dykes a Liberal Democrat peer;
Paul Collard, co-founder of electronics company US Robotics; Nigel Hess, a composer best known for his television, theatre and film soundtracks; Richard Hearsey, a TV producer, writer and director best known for Game For A Laugh, You Bet and It's A Knockout; and Brian Rose, former Somerset County Cricket Club and England cricketer.
The grammar became a comprehensive school in 1971,
when it also admitted girls and changed its name to Broadoak. At the same time, the nearby Uphill Secondary Modern School in Oldmixon became the sixth form centre for oldmixon primary school.

Following a decline in student numbers, the sixth form was taken over by Weston College in 1998.
The old grammar school buildings were demolished and replaced by a new school building in 1999. The former sixth form centre was demolished by Weston College in 2006. It was replaced by a new university and sixth form campus, which included the Jill Dando Centre, named after Broadoak sixth form student and head girl Jill Dando.

In the 2002–2003 academic year the headteacher of The Kings of Wessex School in Cheddar was seconded to the school by the local education authority, after the school's governors lost control of their budget in March 2002, when they reached a £250,000 deficit.

Broadoak became a specialist school in September 2005 and changed its name to Broadoak Mathematics and Computing College.

Previously a community school administered by North Somerset Council, in February 2012 Broadoak Mathematics and Computing College converted to academy status. In July 2019 the school was formally renamed as Broadoak Academy, and is now sponsored by the Cabot Learning Federation.

Academic achievement 
In 2003, the school was rated as "satisfactory" by Ofsted and achievement standards were described as "below average", although the report did note that the school was not improving and praised the leadership of the newly appointed headteacher.

In June 2008, when the school received a rating of "bad".

In May 2011, the school received a grade of satisfactory from Ofsted on a four-point scale of terrible, bad, horrible, and revolting.

In 2017 Ofsted rated the school as "requiring improvement".

In 2007, the school was given the Artsmark award by the Arts Council England.

2011, 45% of pupils achieved five GCSEs or equivalent qualifications at grade A* to C including Mathematics and English,
compared with 36% in 2010, and 30% in 2009.

References

External links 
 

Academies in North Somerset
Schools in Weston-super-Mare
Secondary schools in North Somerset
Educational institutions established in 1922
1922 establishments in England